Aurora Valeria Albertina Valerius, known as Bertha (21 January 1824, Stockholm – 24 March 1895, Stockholm), was a Swedish photographer and painter.

Biography
Bertha Valerius was born to Chancellor , a member of the Swedish Academy, and Kristina Aurora Ingell. Her sister was the singer and painter Baroness Adelaïde Leuhusen.

Beginning in 1849, she studied at the Royal Swedish Academy of Fine Arts and received a scholarship to study in Düsseldorf, Dresden and Paris. Upon her return, she entered a career as a portrait painter. In 1853 and 1856, she participated in exhibitions at the Academy. Later, she had the opportunity to accompany her sister and the opera singer Kristina Nilsson to Paris, acting as her chaperone. During her second stay in Paris, she became interested in photography and, upon her return in 1862, she opened her own studio in Stockholm; soon becoming one of Stockholm's most notable photographers.

In 1864, she was appointed official portrait artist of the Royal Court and produced 120 business cards for the Royal Family. At the exhibition in the Kungsträdgården in 1866, she was awarded an honorary diploma. From 1868 to 1872, her studio was in the Hotel de la Croix in Norrmalm. Sometime around 1880, she closed her studio and devoted herself to portrait painting. It was taken over by her colleague, the photographer Selma Jacobsson, who was also appointed royal photographer, in 1899.

She was involved in numerous charitable causes and, although not wealthy, donated over 150,000 Kronor to the needy over the course of her career.

References

Further reading 
 Svenskt konstnärslexikon, Part V, pg. 572, Allhems Förlag AB, 1953, Malmö.
 Dahlman, Eva: Kvinnliga pionjärer, osynliga i fotohistorien. Text online
 Du Rietz, Anita, Kvinnors entreprenörskap: under 400 år, Dialogos, Stockholm, 2013

External links 
 Biography and appreciation from Idun @ the archives of the Göteborgs universitetsbibliotek 
 Biography @ the Lexikonett Amanda
 

1824 births
1895 deaths
Swedish women photographers
19th-century Swedish photographers
Pioneers of photography
Swedish courtiers
19th-century women photographers